École supérieure des techniques aéronautiques et de construction automobile (ESTACA) is a French engineering School, so called "Grande École", created in 1925.

ESTACA is an Engineering school that trains engineers in aeronautics & aerospace engineering, naval engineering, automotive engineering and railway engineering. In addition to its training activities, the school also conducts applied research in the aeronautics, automotive, space, guided transport and naval sectors.

Located in Montigny-le-Bretonneux, Bordeaux and Laval, the school is recognised by the Commission des Titres d'Ingénieur. On 25 September 2012, it joined the ISAE Group.

Notable alumni 
 Laurent Mekies, a French engineer 
 Igor Sikorsky, a Russian–American aviation pioneer in both helicopters and fixed-wing aircraft
 Rémi Taffin, a French engineer
 Frédéric Vasseur, a French motor sport engineer and manager

References

External links
 ESTACA

Aeronautical engineering schools in France
Engineering universities and colleges in France
ESTACA
Yvelines
Educational institutions established in 1925
1925 establishments in France